Rishi Sunak (born 12 May 1980) is a British politician who has served as Prime Minister of the United Kingdom and Leader of the Conservative Party since October 2022. He previously held two cabinet positions under Boris Johnson, lastly as Chancellor of the Exchequer from 2020 to 2022. Sunak has been Member of Parliament (MP) for Richmond (Yorks) since 2015.

Sunak was born in Southampton to parents of Indian descent who migrated to Britain from East Africa in the 1960s. He was educated at Winchester College, studied philosophy, politics and economics at Lincoln College, Oxford, and earned an MBA from Stanford University in California as a Fulbright Scholar. During his time at Oxford University, Sunak undertook an internship at Conservative Campaign Headquarters and joined the Conservative Party. After graduating, Sunak worked for Goldman Sachs and later as a partner at the hedge fund firms The Children's Investment Fund Management and Theleme Partners.

Sunak was elected to the House of Commons for Richmond in North Yorkshire at the 2015 general election. As a backbencher, Sunak supported the successful campaign for Brexit in the 2016 European Union (EU) membership referendum. Following the 2017 general election, Sunak was appointed to a junior ministerial position in Prime Minister Theresa May's second government as Parliamentary Under-Secretary of State for Local Government in the 2018 cabinet reshuffle. He voted three times in favour of May's Brexit withdrawal agreement, which was rejected by Parliament three times, leading to May announcing her resignation. During the 2019 Conservative Party leadership election, Sunak supported Johnson's successful bid to succeed May as Conservative leader and prime minister, after which he appointed Sunak as Chief Secretary to the Treasury in July 2019. 

Following the 2019 general election, Johnson promoted Sunak to Chancellor of the Exchequer in the 2020 cabinet reshuffle after the resignation of Sajid Javid. During his time in the position, Sunak was prominent in the government's financial response to the COVID-19 pandemic and its economic impact, including the Coronavirus Job Retention and Eat Out to Help Out schemes. He was also involved in the government's response to the cost of living crisis, UK energy supply crisis, and global energy crisis. Sunak resigned as chancellor in July 2022 amid a government crisis that culminated in Johnson's resignation.

Sunak stood in the July–September Conservative Party leadership election to succeed Johnson. He had received the most votes in each of the series of MP votes, but lost the members' vote to Foreign Secretary Liz Truss. After spending the duration of Truss's premiership on the backbenches, Sunak stood in the October 2022 Conservative Party leadership election to succeed Truss, who resigned amid another government crisis. He was elected unopposed as Conservative leader and appointed prime minister. He is the first British Asian and Hindu to hold the office of prime minister. Sunak took office amid the cost of living crisis and energy supply crisis that began during his chancellorship. He has authorised foreign aid and weapons shipments to Ukraine in response to the Russian invasion of the country.

Early life and education
Sunak was born on 12 May 1980 in Southampton General Hospital in Southampton, Hampshire, to Southeast African-born Hindu parents of Indian Punjabi descent, Yashvir and Usha Sunak. He attended Stroud School, a preparatory school in Romsey, and later studied at Winchester College as a dayboy, becoming head boy of the college. He worked as a waiter in a curry house in Southampton during his summer holidays. He read philosophy, politics and economics at Lincoln College, Oxford, graduating with a first in 2001. During his time at university, he undertook an internship at Conservative Campaign Headquarters and joined the Conservative Party. In 2006, Sunak earned a Master of Business Administration postgraduate degree from Stanford University as a Fulbright Scholar. While at Stanford, he met his future wife Akshata Murty, the daughter of Indian billionaire N. R. Narayana Murthy of Infosys.

Sunak's paternal grandfather was from Gujranwala (present-day Pakistan), while his maternal grandfather was from Ludhiana (present-day India); both cities at the time were in Punjab province, British India. His grandparents migrated to East Africa, and then to the United Kingdom in the 1960s.

His father, Yashvir Sunak, was born and raised in the Colony and Protectorate of Kenya (present-day Kenya), and is a general practitioner in the National Health Service. His mother, Usha Sunak, born in Tanganyika (which later became part of Tanzania), was a pharmacist and owned the Sunak Pharmacy in Southampton between 1995 and 2014, and has a degree from Aston University.

Sunak is the eldest of three siblings. His brother, Sanjay (born 1982), is a psychologist and his sister, Raakhi Williams (born 1985), works in New York as chief of strategy and planning at the United Nations global fund for education in emergencies.

Business career
Sunak worked as an analyst for the investment bank Goldman Sachs between 2001 and 2004. He then worked for hedge fund management firm the Children's Investment Fund Management, becoming a partner in September 2006. He left in November 2009 to join former colleagues in California at a new hedge fund firm, Theleme Partners, which launched in October 2010 with $700 million under management. At both hedge funds, his boss was Patrick Degorce. Sunak was also a director of the investment firm Catamaran Ventures, owned by his father-in-law, the Indian businessman N. R. Narayana Murthy of Infosys, between 2013 and 2015.

Early political career

Member of Parliament

Sunak joined the Conservative Party in 2010. He was selected as the Conservative candidate for Richmond (Yorks) in October 2014, defeating Wendy Morton. The seat was previously held by William Hague, a former leader of the party who had served in various cabinet positions under David Cameron. The seat is one of the safest Conservative seats in the United Kingdom and has been held by the party for over 100 years. In the same year Sunak was head of the Black and Minority Ethnic (BME) Research Unit of centre-right think tank Policy Exchange, for which he co-wrote a report on BME communities in the UK. He was elected as MP for the constituency at the 2015 general election with a majority of 19,550 (36.2%). During the 2015–2017 parliament he was a member of the Environment, Food and Rural Affairs Select Committee.

Sunak supported the successful campaign for the UK to leave the European Union in the June 2016 European Union membership referendum. That year, he wrote a report for the Centre for Policy Studies (a Thatcherite think tank) supporting the establishment of free ports after Brexit, and the following year wrote a report advocating the creation of a retail bond market for small and medium-sized enterprises. Following Cameron's resignation, Sunak endorsed Michael Gove in the 2016 Conservative Party leadership election, and later endorsed successful candidate Theresa May after Gove was eliminated in the second round of voting.

Sunak was re-elected at the 2017 general election with an increased majority of 23,108 (40.5%). In 2017, Sunak described the importance and fragility of Britain's undersea infrastructure. Sunak was re-elected at the 2019 general election with an increased majority of 27,210 (47.2%).

Parliamentary Under-Secretary of State for Local Government (2018–2019) 
Sunak was appointed to a junior ministerial position in May's second government as Parliamentary Under-Secretary of State for Local Government in the 2018 cabinet reshuffle. Sunak voted for May's Brexit withdrawal agreement on all three occasions, and voted against a second referendum on any withdrawal agreement. May's withdrawal agreement was rejected by Parliament three times, leading to May announcing her resignation in May 2019.

Sunak supported Boris Johnson in the 2019 Conservative Party leadership election and co-wrote an article with fellow MPs Robert Jenrick and Oliver Dowden to advocate for Johnson during the campaign in June.

Chief Secretary to the Treasury (2019–2020)
Following Johnson's appointment as Conservative leader and prime minister, Sunak was appointed Chief Secretary to the Treasury, serving under Chancellor Sajid Javid. He became a member of the Privy Council the next day. During the 2019 general election, Sunak represented the Conservatives in the BBC's and ITV's seven-way election debates.

Chancellor of the Exchequer (2020–2022)

On 13 February, Sunak was promoted to chancellor as part of the 2020 cabinet reshuffle, after Javid had resigned that day following a meeting with Johnson.

COVID-19 pandemic

On 17 March 2020, amid the COVID-19 pandemic and its economic impact, Sunak became prominent in the government's response. He introduced a programme providing £330 billion in emergency support for businesses, as well as a furlough scheme for employees. This was the first time a British government had created such an employee retention scheme. The scheme was introduced on 20 March 2020 as providing grants to employers to pay 80% of a staff wage and employment costs each month, up to a total of £2,500 per person per month. The cost was estimated at £14 billion a month to run.

The Coronavirus Job Retention Scheme initially ran for three months and was backdated to 1 March. Following a three-week extension of the countrywide lockdown the scheme was extended by Sunak until the end of June 2020. At the end of May, Sunak extended the scheme until the end of October 2020. The decision to extend the job retention scheme was made to avoid or defer mass redundancies, company bankruptcies and potential unemployment levels not seen since the 1930s.
In July 2020, Sunak unveiled a plan for a further £30 billion of spending which included a stamp duty holiday, a cut to value-added tax (VAT) for the hospitality sector, a job retention bonus for employers and the Eat Out to Help Out scheme, aimed at supporting and creating jobs in the hospitality industry. The government subsidised food and soft drinks at participating cafes, pubs and restaurants at 50%, up to £10 per person. The offer was available from 3 to 31 August on Monday to Wednesday each week. In total, the scheme subsidised £849 million in meals. Some considered the scheme to be a success in boosting the hospitality industry, whilst others disagreed. A 2020 study found that the scheme contributed to a rise in COVID-19 infection, which Johnson acknowledged but the Treasury rejected.

The Winter Economy Plan was delivered by Sunak on 24 September 2020. The purpose of the statement was to announce measures aimed at further helping to promote economic recovery following the impact of the COVID-19 pandemic. The plan aimed to further promote economic recovery while preserving jobs and businesses which were considered viable. After a second lockdown in England on 31 October 2020, the programme was extended until 2 December 2020; this was followed on 5 November by an extension until 31 March 2021. On 17 December, the programme was further extended until 30 April 2021. In the 2021 United Kingdom budget announced on 3 March 2021, Sunak confirmed that the scheme had been extended once again until 30 September 2021.

In October 2021, Sunak made his third and final budget statement, which included substantial spending promises related to science and education. The budget increased in-work support through the Universal Credit system by increasing the work allowances by £500 a year, and reducing the post-tax deduction taper rate from 63% to 55%. £560 million of investment was announced for the Levelling Up White Paper. Many of the announcements to be made in the budget were previewed before budget day, drawing criticism and anger from the House of Commons. In response to the criticism, Sunak said the budget "begins the work of preparing for a new economy".

In April 2022, amid the Partygate scandal, Sunak was issued a fixed penalty notice by the police who found he had committed offences under COVID-19 regulations by attending a birthday party for Johnson on 19 June 2020. The police also issued 125 fixed penalty notices to 82 other individuals, including Johnson and his wife Carrie Symonds, who all apologised and paid the penalties. After receiving the fine, Sunak said he was "extremely and sincerely sorry" for the hurt caused by him attending the party, and that he respected the police's decision to give him a fine.

Cost of living crisis and energy crisis 

As the rising cost of living became an increasingly serious and worrying issue for the country, the UK government including Sunak intensified its efforts to respond to the crisis in May 2022, with a £5 billion windfall tax on energy companies to help fund a £15 billion support package for the public. The package included every household getting a £400 discount on energy bills, which would be in addition to a £150 council tax refund the government had already ordered. For about 8 million of the UK's lowest income households, a further £650 payment was announced. Additionally, pensioners or those with disability would qualify for extra payments, on top of the £550 that every household gets, and the £650 they would receive if they had a low income.

Sunak made his spring statement on 23 March 2022. He cut fuel duty, removed VAT on energy saving equipment (such as solar panels and insulation) and reduced national insurance payments for small businesses and, while continuing with a planned national insurance rise in April, he promised to align the primary threshold with the basic personal income allowance as of July. He also promised a reduction in income tax in 2024. Sunak also provided some funding to help vulnerable people cope with the rising cost of living.

Other actions 
Sunak hosted a G7 summit in London in June 2021. A tax reform agreement was signed, which in principle sought to establish a global minimum tax on multinationals and online technology companies. In October 2021, the OECD signed an accord to join the tax reform plan. Later that month, Sunak attended COP26 in Glasgow. During his speech given on 3 November, he said that he felt optimism despite daunting challenges and that by bringing together finance ministers, businesses and investors, COP26 could begin to deliver targets from the Paris Agreement.

Sunak and his family's wealth 
In November 2020, Sunak was reported by The Guardian to have not declared a significant amount of his wife and family's financial interests on the register of ministers' interests, including a combined £1.7billion shareholding in the Indian company Infosys.  Alistair Graham, former chair of the Committee on Standards in Public Life stated Sunak should disclose his financial interests and those of his close family due to “the chancellor’s capacity to determine the government’s financial and business policies.  He seems to have taken the most minimalist approach possible to this requirement. Perhaps Rishi Sunak should carefully read the ‘Seven principles of Public Life’ to make sure he is fulfilling the two principles of ‘Honesty and Leadership’.”
 Ministers are required to declare interests that are "relevant" to their responsibilities and "which might be thought to give rise to a conflict" with their public duties. The independent adviser on ministers' interests investigated and concluded that Sunak had not broken any rules.

In early 2022, newspapers reported that Murty had non-domiciled status, meaning she did not have to pay tax on income earned abroad while living in the UK. The status cost approximately £30,000 to secure, and allowed her to avoid paying an estimated £20 million in UK taxes. Following media controversy, Murty stated on 8 April that she would pay UK taxes on her global income, adding in a statement that she did not want the issue "to be a distraction for my husband". A Whitehall inquiry was launched into who had leaked the details of her tax status.

Reporting around this time also revealed that Sunak had continued to hold United States' permanent resident (green card) status he had acquired in the 2000s until 2021, including for 18 months after he was made chancellor, which required filing annual US tax returns. An investigation into both his wife's tax status and his residency status found that Sunak had not broken any ministerial rules.

Run-up to becoming Prime Minister

Resignation as Chancellor 

On 5 July 2022, Sunak and Health Secretary Sajid Javid resigned almost simultaneously amid a scandal surrounding the sexual harassment allegations against Chris Pincher, which arose after it was revealed that Johnson had promoted Pincher to the position despite knowing of the allegations beforehand. Sunak was the second of 61 Conservative MPs to resign during the government crisis. In his resignation letter Sunak said:The public rightly expect government to be conducted properly, competently and seriously. I recognise this may be my last ministerial job, but I believe these standards are worth fighting for and that is why I am resigning. It has become clear to me that our approaches are fundamentally too different. I am sad to be leaving Government but I have reluctantly come to the conclusion that we cannot continue like this.He was succeeded as chancellor by Nadhim Zahawi. Following the resignations of Sunak and Javid, numerous junior ministers and among the Parliamentary Private Secretary (PPS) also resigned, most of whom cited a lack of honesty and integrity on the part of Johnson. In the following 24 hours, 36 MPs resigned from their roles in government. This marked both the largest number of ministerial resignations in a 24-hour period since the British Empire Economic Conference in 1932, and the largest number of such resignations on record. After a total of 62 resignations, Johnson announced on 7 July his intention to resign as Conservative leader and prime minister, but said he would remain prime minister until a new leader was in place.

Conservative leadership bids 

On 8 July 2022, Sunak announced his candidacy in the Conservative Party leadership election to replace Johnson. Sunak launched his campaign in a video posted to social media, writing that he would "restore trust, rebuild the economy and reunite the country". He said that his values were "patriotism, fairness, hard work", and pledged to "crack down on gender neutral language". During the campaign, Sunak pledged to included tax cuts only when inflation was under control, scrapping of the 5% VAT rate on household energy for one year, introducing a temporary £10 fine for patients who fail to attend GP appointments, capping of refugee numbers, and a tightening of the definition of asylum.

On 20 July, Sunak and Foreign Secretary Liz Truss emerged as the final two candidates in the contest on 20 July to be put forward to the membership for the final leadership vote. He had received the most votes in each of the series of MP votes with Sunak receiving 137 to Truss's 113 in the final round. In the membership vote, Truss received 57.4% of the vote, making her the new leader. He spent the duration of Truss's premiership on the backbenches.

Truss announced her resignation on 20 October 2022 amid a government crisis, triggering a leadership contest. On 22 October, it was reported that Sunak had the required number of supporters—100 members of the House of Commons—to run in the ballot on 24 October. The total number of MPs who publicly declared support passed 100 on the afternoon of 22 October. On 23 October, Sunak declared that he would stand for election. After Johnson ruled himself out of the race and Penny Mordaunt withdrew her candidacy, Sunak was announced as the new Conservative leader on 24 October.

Prime Minister (2022–present) 

Following Truss's resignation, Sunak, as the leader of the Conservative Party, became the prime minister on 25 October 2022, after accepting King Charles III's invitation to form a government. In his first speech as prime minister, Sunak promised “integrity, professionalism and accountability,” and said that "we will create a future worthy of the sacrifices so many have made and fill tomorrow, and everyday thereafter with hope." Of his predecessor, Sunak said that Truss "was not wrong" to want to improve growth, but admitted that "some mistakes were made", and that he was elected prime minister in part to fix them. He promised to "place economic stability and confidence at the heart of this government's agenda".

Cabinet 

Sunak began to appoint his cabinet on 25 October 2022. Jeremy Hunt remained as chancellor, a role he was given during the Truss ministry after Kwasi Kwarteng was dismissed on 14 October. Dominic Raab was also re-appointed Deputy Prime Minister and Justice Secretary, a role he was given during the premiership of Boris Johnson. James Cleverly remained as Foreign Secretary with Suella Braverman returning as Secretary of State for the Home Department, a role from which she had previously resigned during the Truss ministry. Ben Wallace remained as Secretary of State for Defence, a role from which he had previously during the Johnson and Truss ministries. Michael Gove returned as Levelling Up Secretary, a role he was sacked from by Johnson, and Grant Shapps was demoted from Home Secretary to Secretary of State for Business, Energy and Industrial Strategy. Penny Mordaunt remained as Leader of the House of Commons and Lord President of the Council, roles from which she had during the Truss ministry.

Other key appointments included Simon Hart as Parliamentary Secretary to the Treasury and Chief Whip of the House of Commons, Nadhim Zahawi as Party Chairman, Oliver Dowden as Chancellor of the Duchy of Lancaster, Thérèse Coffey as Environment Secretary, Mel Stride as Work and Pensions Secretary and Mark Harper as Transport Secretary.

Sunak was criticised for his appointment of Gavin Williamson and Dominic Raab to the cabinet. Both had been accused of bullying, a charge they both denied. Williamson later resigned, whilst eight complaints were being formally investigated over the allegations brought against Dominic Raab. Sunak was also criticised for returning Braverman to the cabinet, despite her previous resignation for breaking the Ministerial Code. Sunak said that his appointments to the government were in an attempt to reflect a "unified party".  On 29 January 2023 Sunak dismissed Zahawi, stating that ethics adviser Laurie Magnus had found a "serious breach" of the ministerial code. Sunak's judgement was questioned for originally reappointing Zahawi, and there were also questions over whether Sunak should have dismissed him earlier.

Environment 

In a reversal of his predecessor's policy, Sunak reinstated the ban on fracking on 26 October as outlined in the 2019 Conservative manifesto.

In October, Sunak initially said that he would not attend the 2022 United Nations Climate Change Conference in Egypt, to allow him to concentrate on urgent domestic matters. Following pressure from MPs, environmentalist campaigners and others, Sunak announced that he would attend.

Sunak attended a reception held by the king at Buckingham Palace on 4 November. Sunak told the meeting of approximately 200 politicians and campaigners that the UK would continue with its environmental aims after the end of its COP26 presidency. In his speech, Sunak said that climate change would cause long-lasting human suffering, and that because of inaction, people risked giving their children a desperate inheritance. Sunak also paid tribute to the king's longstanding work for the environment.

On 7 November at the COP27 summit, Sunak launched The Forest and Climate Leaders' Partnership (FCLP), building on a policy called the Glasgow Climate Pact, originally started at COP 26. The partnership aims to halt and reverse deforestation by 2030, bringing 26 countries and the European Union together. These countries account for 60% of global GDP and over 33% of the world's forests and together with private funding, the partnership has total funds of $23.8bn. In his speech to the Forest and Climate Leaders' Summit, Sunak said that the world's forests have been undervalued and underestimated, yet were one of the natural wonders of the world. He then asked attendees to build upon what had already been achieved to secure an incredible legacy for generations to come. The FCLP will hold annual meetings and starting in 2023, it will publish an annual Global Progress Report that includes independent assessments.

Foreign policy 

Following the 2022 missile explosion in Poland, Sunak met US president Joe Biden and gave a speech about the explosion. He later met Ukrainian president Volodymyr Zelenskyy during his first visit to Kyiv, and pledged to give Ukraine £50 million in aid.

Political positions 

According to Euronews, Sunak is "frequently perceived as a pragmatist and as belonging to the centre-ground of the Conservative Party." He opposed the fiscal policies of his predecessor, Liz Truss, and although described as a fellow Thatcherite, is viewed as less economically liberal than Truss.

Crime and Anti-terror Strategy 

On crime, Sunak proposed an automatic one-year extension to prison sentences for prolific criminals, as well as cutting the minimum sentence before a foreign criminal is eligible for deportation from twelve months to six. He proposed life imprisonment for leaders of child grooming gangs, and for police to record the ethnicity of those involved in such gangs.

In August 2022, he proposed widening the Prevent strategy by widening the definition of "extremism".

European Union
Sunak supported the Leave campaign during the 2016 EU referendum. Speaking in 2022, Sunak said, "I voted for Brexit, I believe in Brexit". Sunak also said the UK would not be pursuing a relationship with the EU post-Brexit if the UK had to align with EU laws.

In January 2023, Sunak confirmed that the deadline for removal of EU legislation from the UK statute book would remain the end of that year, saying that it should be a "collective effort". In February of that year, Sunak negotiated a proposed agreement with the EU on Northern Ireland's trading arrangements which was published as the "Windsor Framework". On 27 February, Sunak delivered a statement to the House of Commons, saying that the proposed agreement "protects Northern Ireland’s place in our Union.

Energy and the environment 
Sunak has signed the Conservative Environment Pledge (CEP), as shown on the Conservative Environment Network (CEN) website which has the support of approximately 127 MPs. The CEP has five main commitments, which are in summary: i) Using Brexit freedoms for the environment and sustainable farming. ii) Backing British clean energy suppliers so as to boost energy security. iii) Encouraging the use of domestic insulation and electric vehicle charging points. iv) Implementing the Environment Act. v) Backing technologies that will help to achieve clean growth. During the leadership contest held over summer 2022, Sunak told the CEN that he was engaged with the protection of the environment for future generations.

Sunak has said he is committed to keeping the legal commitment of reaching net zero by 2050. During the summer, he said that he intended to make the UK energy independent by 2045, while advocating for more offshore windpower, more solar panels on rooftops and improved insulation of homes to make them more energy efficient. Sunak is said to have listened to fellow MPs with a green agenda and that he was a believer in net zero for the UK. Sunak also voted against a call for Britain to eliminate most greenhouse gas emissions from transportation by 2030.While campaigning in August 2022, Sunak wrote that he would restrict the use of solar panels on farmland but would make sure solar is installed on commercial buildings, properties and sheds. "On my watch, we will not lose swathes of our best farmland to solar farms." The trade association Solar Energy U.K. said the solar industry was "deeply concerned" with candidates Sunak and Truss' intentions.

Sunak has backed fracking, where it is supported by local residents. On 19 October in the debate on "Ban on Fracking for Shale Gas Bill (Division 66)", he voted with the government against the ban on fracking. Fracking had been banned by the government in November 2019 after a report by the Oil and Gas Authority found that it was not possible at that time to predict the probability or strength of earthquakes caused by fracking.

While Chancellor, Sunak attended COP 26 in Glasgow. During the speech he gave on 3 November, he said that he felt optimism despite daunting challenges and that by bringing together finance ministers, businesses and investors, COP 26 could begin to deliver targets from the Paris Agreement. He outlined three actions: First, the need for increased public investment, with the U.K. committing £100 million to the Taskforce on Access to Climate Finance. He announced support for a new Capital Markets Mechanism which will issue green bonds in the U.K. to fund renewable energy in developing countries. Second, mobilising private finance, with the Glasgow Financial Alliance for Net Zero bringing together organisations with assets over $130 trillion to be deployed. Third, the rewiring of the entire global financial system for net zero, which would include better climate data, mandatory sustainability disclosures, climate risk surveillance and stronger global reporting standards. Also announced was that the UK will become the first ever 'Net Zero Aligned Financial Centre'.

During an interview in July 2022, Sunak said that wind generation will be a part of his governments' energy policies, but he wanted to reassure communities that there would not be a relaxation of the current onshore planning laws, with more of a focus on offshore wind farms. This stance was confirmed recently by the PM's press team, who said that Sunak wants "offshore not onshore wind". When asked about wind generation by MP Alan Whitehead at Prime Minister's Questions (26 October), Sunak responded that, as outlined in the Conservative manifesto of 2019, he would focus on long term energy security, including more offshore wind. Onshore wind generation was made difficult by the National Planning Policy Framework 2016 Update, but as part of his predecessors' policies, the planning laws were set to be relaxed.

Foreign policy 
In July 2022, during his run for the Conservative Party leadership, he called China the "biggest long-term threat" to Britain, adding that "They torture, detain and indoctrinate their own people, including in Xinjiang and Hong Kong, in contravention of their human rights. And they have continually rigged the global economy in their favour by suppressing their currency." He accused China of supporting Russian President Vladimir Putin and also said that China was "stealing our technology and infiltrating our universities". However, he softened his attitude after becoming Prime Minister, calling the country a "systemic challenge" instead of a threat", and that the West would "manage this sharpening competition, including with diplomacy and engagement".

Sunak described Saudi Arabia as a "partner" and "ally", but said that the British government does not ignore human rights violations in Saudi Arabia. According to Sunak, "It's absolutely right that" the British government "engages with our partners and allies around the world as we contemplate how best to ensure energy security for this country."

During his chancellorship, Sunak opposed US President Joe Biden's plan to introduce a minimum 21 percent global business tax.

Sunak supported the recognition of Jerusalem as the capital of Israel.

Russia and Ukraine 

Sunak supports Ukraine against the Russian invasion of the country and supports economic sanctions against Russia, but opposes British military intervention in Ukraine.

After meeting Ukrainian President Volodymyr Zelenskyy during his first visit to Kyiv in November 2022, Sunak said: "I am proud of how the UK stood with Ukraine from the very beginning. And I am here today to say the UK and our allies will continue to stand with Ukraine, as it fights to end this barbarous war and deliver a just peace. While Ukraine's armed forces succeed in pushing back Russian forces on the ground, civilians are being brutally bombarded from the air. We are today providing new air defence, including anti-aircraft guns, radar and anti-drone equipment, and stepping up humanitarian support for the cold, hard winter ahead."

LGBT rights
In July 2022, Sunak said that he wanted the UK to be "the safest and greatest country in the world to be LGBT+". When asked about alleged or perceived transphobia within his party, he stated that "prejudice against trans people is wrong. The Conservative Party is an open, welcoming family to everybody across society, no matter who they are and irrespective of their background." Sunak believes that transgender people should be "respected", but said that he views biology as "important" and "fundamental" regarding bathrooms and competitive sports.

Immigration 
Sunak has expressed support for lowering net migration. An official spokesperson said, "He's committed to ensuring we have control over our borders and the public rightly expects us to control immigration and have a system that works best for the UK." He has said that the "current asylum system is broken and it needs to be fixed urgently", saying he would, in his first 100 days as prime minister, "tighten our statutory definition of who qualifies for asylum in the UK ... This will prevent anyone who enters the UK illegally from staying here", that the "Parliament will be given control of the number of refugees we accept each year", that he "cannot underestimate the role of data sharing which will make it easier to identify people who are in the UK illegally", and that the Rwanda asylum plan "is the right one." Responding to criticism surrounding some of his proposals about illegal immigration, Sunak said there was "absolutely nothing racist" about it.

On 4 January 2023, Sunak set out his priorities for 2023, which included: "We will pass new laws to stop small boats, making sure that if you come to this country illegally, you are detained and swiftly removed."

Public image 

Following his appointment as chancellor, Sunak arrived in public discourse from relative obscurity. In the early stages of the COVID-19 pandemic, he was popular by the standards of British politics, described by one analyst as having "better ratings than any politician since the heydays of Tony Blair". Various polls showed Sunak remained overwhelmingly popular among Conservative supporters and many other Britons throughout 2020.

In an Ipsos MORI poll in September 2020, Sunak had the highest satisfaction score of any British Chancellor since Labour's Denis Healey in April 1978, and was widely seen as the favourite to become the next Prime Minister and leader of Conservative Party after Boris Johnson. Sunak developed a cult media following, with jokes and gossip about his attractiveness widespread on social media and in magazines, gaining the nickname "Dishi Rishi".

Public attitudes towards Sunak remained broadly positive in 2021, though his popularity declined steadily over time. By early 2022, with the cost of living becoming a growing focus of public concern, Sunak's response as chancellor was perceived as inadequate and he received some of his lowest approval ratings, which continued as the Sunak family's financial affairs came under scrutiny. By the time he resigned as chancellor in July 2022, Sunak's approval ratings slightly recovered.

In October 2022, following his appointment as prime minister, Sunak's personal favourability ratings increased.

On 20 January 2023, Sunak was issued a fixed penalty notice by Lancashire Police for failing to wear a seatbelt in the back of his ministerial car while filming an Instagram video to promote his government's levelling up policy. Sunak apologised for the incident, saying it was an "error of judgement".

Personal life

In August 2009, he married Akshata Murty, the daughter of N. R. Narayana Murthy, the founder of the technology company Infosys in which Murty owns a stake. Sunak and Murty met while studying at Stanford University in the U.S.; they have two daughters, Krishna (born 2011) and Anoushka (born 2013). They own several houses, including the Kirby Sigston Manor in the village of Kirby Sigston, North Yorkshire, a mews house in Earl's Court in central London, a flat on the Old Brompton Road, South Kensington, and a penthouse apartment on Ocean Avenue in Santa Monica, California.

Sunak is a teetotaller. He has stated he is a Coca-Cola addict and now has seven dental fillings due to excessive consumption when he was younger. He was previously a governor of the East London Science School. Sunak has a Labrador called Nova and is a cricket and horse racing enthusiast.

Sunak is a Hindu. He took his oath as an MP at the House of Commons on the Bhagavad Gita. In the aftermath of the murder of George Floyd, Sunak spoke out against the racism he faced in his life and how his family struggled while immigrating to Britain in the 1960s.

Sunak is a close friend of The Spectator former political editor James Forsyth, whom he has known since their school days. Sunak was the best man at Forsyth's wedding to the journalist Allegra Stratton, and they are godparents to each other's children. He appointed Forsyth as his political secretary in December 2022. In April 2022, it was reported that Sunak and Murty had moved out of 11 Downing Street to a newly refurbished West London home.

References

External links

 
1980 births
Living people
21st-century prime ministers of the United Kingdom
Alumni of Lincoln College, Oxford
British Indian history
British politicians of Indian descent
Chancellors of the Exchequer of the United Kingdom
Chief Secretaries to the Treasury
Conservative Party prime ministers of the United Kingdom
Conservative Party (UK) MPs for English constituencies
English financial analysts
English Hindus
English people of Kenyan descent
English people of Punjabi descent
English people of Tanzanian descent
Goldman Sachs people
Leaders of the Conservative Party (UK)
Members of the Privy Council of the United Kingdom
Murthy family
People educated at Winchester College
Politicians from Southampton
Prime Ministers of the United Kingdom
Stanford Graduate School of Business alumni
Sunak family
UK MPs 2015–2017
UK MPs 2017–2019
UK MPs 2019–present
Fulbright alumni